Peter L. Hnatiw (born c. 1932) was a Canadian curler. He was the lead of the 1975 Brier Champion team (skipped by Bill Tetley), representing Northern Ontario. The team later went on to finish third at the World Championships of that year. He was a city employee for Thunder Bay, Ontario.

References

External links
 
 Peter Hnatiw – Curling Canada Stats Archive

Brier champions
1930s births
Living people
Curlers from Northern Ontario
Curlers from Thunder Bay
Canadian male curlers